Rose Mountain is a mountain located in the Adirondack Mountains of New York northeast of Bisby Lodge.

References

Mountains of Herkimer County, New York
Mountains of New York (state)